Iron City is a former city and unincorporated community in Lawrence and Wayne counties, Tennessee. The population was 167 at the 2010 census.

Iron City was incorporated as a city from 1887 to 1901, and again from 1962 until 2010, its residents voting to disincorporate in the latter year.

The United States Census bureau treated the community as a Census-designated place for both the 2010 and 2020 census. It had a population of 328 in 2010 and 274 in 2020.

History
Iron City gets its name from an iron foundry that operated in its vicinity in the late 19th century.  While iron ore was mined in southwestern Lawrence County as early as the 1830s, the industry really began to thrive in 1886, when a branch railroad line to the area was completed.  Iron City incorporated the following year.  At its height, Iron City supported a population of about 1,000, and included two hotels and two banks.

Geography
Iron City is situated in the Shoal Creek Valley, north of the Tennessee-Alabama state line.  Iron City is surrounded by rugged hills on the north, south, and west, and by the creek on the east.

State Route 227 passes east-to-west through Iron City, connecting it to St. Joseph across the hills to the east and State Route 13 south of Collinwood to the west.  State Route 242, which intersects SR 227 in Iron City, connects the community with Westpoint and Lawrenceburg to the northeast.  Poplar Street/Pruitton Road connects Iron City with Lauderdale County, Alabama, to the south, becoming County Road 61 at the state line.

According to the United States Census Bureau, the CDP has a total area of 0.9 square miles (2.4 km2), all land.

Demographics

As of the census of 2000, there were 368 people, 151 households, and 107 families residing in the CDP. The population density was 401.4 people per square mile (154.4/km2). There were 159 housing units at an average density of 173.5 per square mile (66.7/km2). The racial makeup of the city was 97.28% White, 2.17% African American, 0.27% from other races, and 0.27% from two or more races. Hispanic or Latino of any race were 1.09% of the population.

There were 151 households, out of which 31.8% had children under the age of 18 living with them, 45.7% were married couples living together, 17.9% had a female householder with no husband present, and 29.1% were non-families. 27.2% of all households were made up of individuals, and 13.2% had someone living alone who was 65 years of age or older. The average household size was 2.44 and the average family size was 2.89.

In the CDP, the population was spread out, with 24.7% under the age of 18, 7.3% from 18 to 24, 32.3% from 25 to 44, 23.6% from 45 to 64, and 12.0% who were 65 years of age or older. The median age was 36 years. For every 100 females, there were 90.7 males. For every 100 females age 18 and over, there were 82.2 males.

The median income for a household in the CDP was $20,625, and the median income for a family was $28,889. Males had a median income of $20,729 versus $15,500 for females. The per capita income for the city was $17,185. About 15.1% of families and 23.0% of the population were below the poverty line, including 30.1% of those under age 18 and 22.6% of those age 65 or over.

In 2020, the population was 274.

Government
As of August 1, 1987, the town no longer had police officers of its own, law enforcement services defaulting to the county sheriff.

Notable people
Iron City is the hometown of 1960s country music star Melba Montgomery.

In popular culture
In 2008, the film, Iron City Blues was released. The film is about a biker/bluesman who travels to Iron City to write a song about the town's history.

References

Census-designated places in Tennessee
Census-designated places in Lawrence County, Tennessee
Census-designated places in Wayne County, Tennessee
Former municipalities in Tennessee
2010 disestablishments in Tennessee
1964 establishments in Tennessee
Populated places disestablished in 2010